Los únicos is a 2011 Argentine superhero live-action television series aired by El Trece in the prime time. The "uniques" are a superhero team working as a covert operation unit. Main actors are Arnaldo André, Mariano Martínez and Griselda Siciliani, the two main supervillains are played by Favio Posca and Carlos Belloso.

Premise
Unlike most productions by Pol-ka, Los únicos is not a telenovela featuring common people or a vengeance plot. Instead, it is a crime fiction comedy with metafictional elements. As such, it avoids the usual constrains of the plots of the aforementioned genres. The plot is influenced by the X-Men film series, Heroes and Sky High.

Nicolás Cabré makes a spin-off of the Sin Código telenovela, playing again his former character of "Axel Etcheverry". In the new plot, the "Nielsen Security" group has gone bankrupt, and Axel blames his former teammate Gabriel Nielsen for it. Nielsen (which was played by Adrián Suar, creator of both series) has appeared a number of times, as well as other characters and references to the former telenovela.

Arnaldo André composed his character, an experimented leader managing a team, based over his own protective relations with relatives, and the ways TV producers try to motivate him to accept a work. He made a deliberate effort to avoid giving an authoritarian style to the character, to avoid comparisons with his former character at Valientes.

Production
The series has had cameos from notable Argentine actors, such as Esteban Prol, Eugenia Suárez, Carlos Baute and Anabela Ascar. Gonzalo Heredia, from the previous successful telenovela Malparida, played himself in a casual scene, with a brief cameo of Juana Viale, also from that telenovela. Osvaldo Laport will play again his former character of "Amador Heredia" from Soy Gitano. Miguel Ángel Rodríguez and Martín Bossi will play crime bosses, and Ana María Orozco will join the team. A fashion show will include the presence of Pía Slapka, acting as herself, and fashion designer Roberto Giordano.

The series had a successful rating, with nearly 20 points.

Plot
The "Uniques" are actually one of several covert operation units of skilled or superpowered people working at different countries. Alfredo Monterrey organized many of those units, and the series is about the creation and organization of the Argentine branch. His recruits are Diego Rouvier, Axel Etcheverry, María Soledad Marini, Rubén Hagi, Rosario Ahumada, Violeta Morano and Hugo Albarracín. María has superhuman strength, Axel has an unbreakable skeleton, Rubén Hagi has indestructible skin, and Violeta Morano is precognitive. Diego, Hugo and Rosario have no superhuman powers: Diego is a skilled secret agent, Hugo is an ex-soldier with a split personality disorder and Rosario a former burglar with a taste for high-stake thefts. The team is opposed by the villains Livio Muzak and Ronco Milevich. Ronco is capable of electric manipulation.

Cast

Brigada "Los Unicos"

In producction 

 Brenda Asnicar as Keira Beltrán 
 Marcelo Mazzarello as Adolfo Fortuna
 María Eugenia Suárez as Sofía Reyes
  as 
 Rodrigo Noya as Bruno Epstein
 Juan Manuel Guilera as Lucas Miller
 Victorio D'Alessandro as Ciro Fuentes
 Julieta Zylberberg as Helena Epstein (season 1)
  as  † (season 1)
 Marina Bellati as Melania
 Leo Kreimer as "Zurdo"
 Ana María Castel as Elvira (season 1)
 Fabián Arenillas as Manuel Soria 
 Carlos Belloso as Livio Muzak † (season 1)
 Favio Posca as Ronco Milevich 
 Fabián Gianola as Dreyfus 
 Martín Bossi as Patrón Carranza
 Tomás Fonzi as Joaquín Ferragut † (season 1)
 Daniel Hendler as Wilson Castro † (season 1)
 Emilio Disi as Américo (season 1)

References

External links
 Official site 
 

2010s Argentine television series
2011 telenovelas
2011 Argentine television series debuts
2012 Argentine television series endings
Superhero comedy television series
Spanish-language telenovelas
Sequel television series
Pol-ka telenovelas